Irene Astor, Baroness Astor of Hever ( Irene Violet Freesia Janet Augusta Haig) (7 October 1919 – 12 August 2001) was an English philanthropist and member of the Astor family. Her philanthropic contributions included being chairman of the Sunshine Fund for Blind Children from 1947 to 1989, during which she raised over £14 million and she served as vice president of the Royal National Institute for the Blind from 1977 to her death in 2001.

Early life
Irene Astor was born Lady Irene Violet Freesia Janet Augusta Haig on 7 October 1919, the youngest of four children of military officer and later Field Marshal Douglas Haig, 1st Earl Haig (1861–1928), and Dorothy Maud Vivian (1879–1939), a daughter of Hussey Vivian, 3rd Baron Vivian. Her father was created Earl Haig when she was 12 days old entitling her to the prefix Lady. Her elder siblings were Lady Alexandra Henrietta Louisa Haig (wife of Rear-Admiral Clarence Howard-Johnston and Hugh Trevor-Roper), Lady Victoria Doris Rachel Haig (wife of Col. Andrew Montagu Douglas Scott) and George Haig, 2nd Earl Haig.

Career
During World War II she worked for the Red Cross, and was also involved in the Girls' Training Corps.

Irene was chairman of the Sunshine Fund for Blind Children from 1947 to 1989. She raised over £14 million as chairman. From 1977 until her death, she served as vice president of the Royal National Institute for the Blind.

Personal life
She married Gavin Astor, later the 2nd Baron Astor of Hever, the eldest son of John Jacob Astor, 1st Baron Astor of Hever, and Violet Mary Elliot-Murray-Kynynmound on 4 October 1945. She became Lady Astor of Hever when her husband succeeded to the barony on the death of his father in 1971. They had five children:

 John Astor, 3rd Baron Astor of Hever (b. 1946), who married twice, first to Fiona Diana Lennox Harvey in 1970; the couple had three daughters and divorced in 1990. He married, secondly, Elizabeth Constance Mackintosh, daughter of John Mackintosh, 2nd Viscount Mackintosh of Halifax, in 1990; the couple have two children.
 Bridget Mary Astor (1948–2017), who married twice, first to Count Arthur Tarnowski in 1980; the couple had two sons before divorcing in 1986. Her second marriage was in 1989 to Geofrey Richard Smith; the couple had one daughter.
 Elizabeth Louise Astor (b. 1951), who married twice, first to David John Shelton Herring in 1979; they divorced in 1981 and she married, secondly, David Joseph Ward in 1985; the couple have two children.
 Sarah Violet Astor (b. 1953), who married George Edward Lopes, son of Massey Lopes, 2nd Baron Roborough, in 1975 and has three children; their son, Harry Marcus George Lopes, is married to Laura Rose Parker Bowles, daughter of Andrew Parker Bowles and Camilla, Queen Consort.
 Philip Douglas Paul Astor (b. 1959), who married twice. His second marriage was in July 2012 to Justine H. Picardie.

She died on 12 August 2001.

References

1919 births
2001 deaths
English women philanthropists
Irene
Livingston family
Daughters of British earls
Astor of Hever
20th-century British philanthropists
21st-century philanthropists
20th-century English nobility
21st-century English nobility
20th-century English women
21st-century English women
20th-century women philanthropists
21st-century women philanthropists